The England national cricket team toured New Zealand in February and March 1963 and played a three-match Test series against the New Zealand national cricket team. England won the series 3–0.

Test series summary

First Test

Second Test

Third Test

References

1963 in English cricket
1963 in New Zealand cricket
New Zealand cricket seasons from 1945–46 to 1969–70
1962-63
International cricket competitions from 1960–61 to 1970